Antarcticavis (meaning "Antarctic bird") is an extinct genus of avialans of uncertain phylogenetic placement, possibly a member of Ornithuromorpha belonging to the group Ornithurae. It is known from a partial skeleton which was discovered in the Snow Hill Island Formation in Antarctica. The type and only species, Antarcticavis capelambensis, was announced in 2019 although the final version of the article naming it was published in 2020.

The holotype, SDSM 78147, consists of two thoracic vertebrae, the sternum keel, the right coracoid and shoulder blade, the sternal part of the left coracoid, the right upper arm, parts of the left upper arm, the proximal right ulna, the proximal left ulna and radius (articulated), the proximal right carpometacarpus, the proximal left carpometacarpus, the distal left carpometacarpus, the synsacrum, the right and left thighs, the proximal right tibiotarsus, the right and left distal tibiotarsus, and the proximal right tarsometatarsus.

References 

Prehistoric ornithurans
Maastrichtian genera
Cretaceous Antarctica
Fossils of Antarctica
Dinosaurs of Antarctica
Fossil taxa described in 2020